Shi Er Sheng Xiao Cheng Shi Ying Xiong is a 2014 Chinese animated comedy film directed by Ge Haitao. It was released on October 3, 2014 in China.

Voice cast
Su Qianyun
Ding Runqi
Wang Yan
Xie Lili

Reception
By October 7, 2014, the film had earned ¥0.48 million at the Chinese box office.

References

2014 comedy films
2014 animated films
2014 films
Animated comedy films
Chinese animated films